Ayb (majuscule: Ա; minuscule: ա; Armenian: այբ) is the first letter of the Armenian alphabet.  It has a numerical value of 1. It represents the open back unrounded vowel (/ɑ/) in both variants of the Armenian language. This letter and the letter Ben (Բ բ) are the two first letters in the Armenian alphabet and forms the etymology of the Armenian word այբուբեն, meaning "alphabet." It is one of the letters originally created by Mesrop Mashtots in the 5th century.

It is homoglyphic to the IPA symbol for the close back unrounded vowel, the Cyrillic letter Sha (Шш), the former Zhuang letter Ɯɯ used from 1957 to 1986, and the Georgian letter oni (ⴍ).

Computing codes

Related characters and other similar characters
 ⴍ : Nuskhuri variant of the Georgian letter Oni 
 Ш ш : Cyrillic letter Sha 
 Ɯ ɯ : Turned M
 ɯ : Close back unrounded vowel
 A a : Latin letter A
 А а : Cyrillic letter A
 ა : Georgian letter Ani
 Α α : Greek alpha

Braille form

See also
 Armenian alphabet
 Mesrop Mashtots
 Ben (letter)

References

External links
 Ա on Wiktionary
 ա on Wiktionary

Armenian letters